West Turin is a town in Lewis County, New York, United States. The population was 1,524 at the 2010 census. The name is derived from its parent town, Turin. West Turin is in the south-central part of the county and is north of Rome.

History 

The town was first settled circa 1796, near Constableville. West Turin was formed from part of Turin in 1830 and was subsequently reduced in size by the formation of newer towns: Montague (1850) and Osceola (1844). The town of West Turin now includes the former town of Highmarket, which was disbanded in 1973. Highmarket had been set apart from West Turin in 1852.

Geography

The Black River forms the eastern town line. West Turin is on the Tug Hill Plateau of northwestern New York.

New York State Route 26 and New York State Route 12D are north-south highways. New York State Route 12 is a north-south highway near the Black River.

Climate
West Turin has a warm-summer humid continental climate (Dfb). Winter is cold and very snowy, with most days not making it to freezing. Snow can fall anytime from October to May, and a consistent snowpack is expected from November to April. Due to its elevation, it is one of the coldest, snowiest, and wettest places in the state. Summer is warm during the day, but it cools off quickly at night.

The low temperature falls below freezing on an average of 188.5 days per year, and it falls below  on 36.5. The high stays below freezing on an average of 81.1 days per year and exceeds  on 0.8 days per year.

Demographics

As of the census of 2000, there were 1,674 people, 635 households, and 433 families residing in the town.  The population density was 16.4 people per square mile (6.3/km2).  There were 971 housing units at an average density of 9.5 per square mile (3.7/km2).  The racial makeup of the town was 99.22% White, 0.18% Native American, 0.06% Asian, 0.24% from other races, and 0.30% from two or more races. Hispanic or Latino of any race were 0.12% of the population.

There were 635 households, out of which 31.2% had children under the age of 18 living with them, 51.8% were married couples living together, 10.1% had a female householder with no husband present, and 31.7% were non-families. 25.8% of all households were made up of individuals, and 13.2% had someone living alone who was 65 years of age or older.  The average household size was 2.64 and the average family size was 3.16.

In the town, the population was spread out, with 27.4% under the age of 18, 7.9% from 18 to 24, 27.7% from 25 to 44, 22.2% from 45 to 64, and 14.9% who were 65 years of age or older.  The median age was 38 years. For every 100 females, there were 104.9 males.  For every 100 females age 18 and over, there were 101.7 males.

The median income for a household in the town was $35,150, and the median income for a family was $41,618. Males had a median income of $32,065 versus $21,838 for females. The per capita income for the town was $15,538.  About 13.5% of families and 16.4% of the population were below the poverty line, including 19.8% of those under age 18 and 13.8% of those age 65 or over.

Communities and locations in West Turin 
Byron Corners – A location northwest of Mohawk Hill.
Collinsville – A hamlet in the northeastern part of the town, west of Lyons Falls village on NY-12D.  The name is from Homer Collins, an early settler. Collinsville Cemetery was listed on the National Register of Historic Places in 2014.
Constableville – The village of Constableville is on NY-26 near the southeast town line.
Fish Creek – A hamlet west of Mohawk Hill by the southwestern town line.
High Market – A location north of Byron Corners.
Lyons Falls – Part of the village of Lyons Falls is at the eastern town line and the Black River.  The falls were formerly called the "High Falls".
Michigan Mills – A hamlet in the western part of the town.
Mohawk Hill – A hamlet in the southern part of the town on NY-26.
Page – A location in the northwestern part of the town.
Potters Corners – A location southwest of Collinsville at the junction of Routes NY-12D and NY-26.

References

Towns in Lewis County, New York